Giuseppe Bigogno (22 July 1909 – 1977) was an Italian footballer and manager from Albizzate in the Province of Varese. He spent eight seasons of his career at Fiorentina. Bigogno went on to manage some of the top clubs in Italy, including Fiorentina, Milan, Internazionale and Torino.

Honours

Player
Genova 1893
Coppa Italia: 1936-37
Fiorentina
Coppa Italia: 1939-40

Manager
Udinese
Serie B: 1955-56

References

1909 births
1977 deaths
Italian footballers
Serie A players
Serie B players
ACF Fiorentina players
Genoa C.F.C. players
Italian football managers
ACF Fiorentina managers
A.C. Milan managers
Torino F.C. managers
S.S. Lazio managers
Udinese Calcio managers
Inter Milan managers
Association football midfielders